Jean de Silhon (1596, Sos, Lot-et-Garonne – February 1667, Paris) was a French philosopher and politician. He was a founding member, and the first to occupy seat 24 of the Académie française in 1634.

At Cardinal Richelieu's prompting, he defended the concept of reason of state, arguing that the political necessities under which the State operates mean that it need not always follow normal laws of ethics, such as telling the truth. Reason of state was thus, he said, "a mean between that which conscience permits and affairs require."

References

 

1596 births
1667 deaths
People from Lot-et-Garonne
French philosophers
Members of the Académie Française
People of the Ancien Régime
French male non-fiction writers